Wolfgang Büchner (born 23 July 1966 in Speyer) is a German journalist.

Life 
He worked for Deutsche Presse-Agentur (dpa). From September 2013 to December 2014 Büchner was editor-in-chief for German magazine Der Spiegel. Since 1 July 2015 he works for Swiss newspaper Blick. He is member of organisation Reporters Without Borders.

Awards 
2014: Special award by European Press Prize (together with British journalist Alan Rusbridger)

References

External links 
 News dpa:Büchner
 News dpa for EANA Award for Excellence

German journalists
German male journalists
20th-century German journalists
21st-century German journalists
1966 births
People from Speyer
Living people
Der Spiegel editors